Mohammed ibn Idris al-Amrawi (1794–1847), or, in full, Abu Abdallah Mohammed ibn Idris ibn Mohammed ibn Idris ibn Mohammed ibn Idris (three times) ibn al-Hajj Mohammed al-Azammuri al-Amrawi al-Fasi was a well-known poet from Fes and the vizier of the sultan Abderrahmane. He was one of the most prominent literary figures of Morocco in the 19th century.

Notes

17th-century Moroccan poets
Moroccan astronomers
1794 births
1847 deaths
People from Fez, Morocco
18th-century Moroccan people
18th-century Moroccan poets